Claypans is a locality in the Murray Mallee region of South Australia. Claypans had a Methodist church in 1928. The school opened in 1907 and closed in 1947. The name refers to the claypan at which the settlers camped on their first night.

References

Towns in South Australia
Murray Mallee